Wim Bleijenberg (5 November 1930 – 10 January 2016) was a Dutch international football player, who played for FC Wageningen, Rigtersbleek, AFC Ajax, Blauw-Wit Amsterdam, Go Ahead Eagles and AGOVV Apeldoorn during his career.

He was nicknamed Wim Kontje (Bill Backside) because of his ability to turn away from his opponents.

Club career

Early career
Born and raised in Veenendaal, on the outskirts of Utrecht, Bleijenberg began his career in the youth ranks of local VV Veenendaal from where he eventually signed with FC Wageningen making his debut in the 1951–52 season, and scoring 21 goals for the side from Wageningen. After just one season however Bleijenberg signed with Enschede club Rigtersbleek where he played 4 seasons, before signing with AFC Ajax.

Ajax
Starting his career with Ajax in the 1956–57 season, Bleijenberg led the club in scoring in league matches having scored 16 goals in 18 league appearances that first season in which he helped Ajax win the National Championship. He led the club in scoring for league matches alongside teammate Piet van der Kuil two years later, scoring 15 goals that season. He would go on to play one more seasons for the club from Amsterdam, bringing his total to four seasons, becoming the club's 45 all-time leading goal scorer (scoring record position as of Jan 2013). He scored 10 goals in official league matches for Ajax the following season, and 15 more the year after that. His final season with Ajax in 1959–60 saw Bleijenberg getting little playing time, only scoring 1 goal in 4 league matches for the club, winning one more league title with Ajax when he scored a hattrick in the title decider against arch-rivals Feyenoord, before transferring across town to local rivals Blauw-Wit Amsterdam at the end of the season. He totalled 88 games, scoring 51 goals in all competitions for Ajax.

Blauw-Wit
Remaining in Amsterdam, Bleijenberg joined Blauw-Wit where he played for one season, scoring 16 goals in 28 league matches before transferring over to Go Ahead Eagles from Deventer. He won promotion with the club in 1961.

Go Ahead Eagles
Moving to Deventer, Bleijenberg would play two seasons for Go Ahead Eagles helping the club to get promoted to the Eredivisie in 1963, before transferring to AGOVV Apeldoorn.

AGOVV Apeldoorn
In 1963 after two seasons with Go Ahead Eagles, Bleijenberg transferred to AGOVV, retiring from professional football after three seasons with the club from Apeldoorn.

International career
From 1953 to 1954, Bleijenberg made 3 appearances for the Netherlands national team, playing a starting role and playing the entire match in all three of his matches. The three fixtures he played in were a 2–0 loss against Belgium at home on 19 April 1953, a 4–0 loss against Norway in an away fixture on 27 September 1953, and finally a 3–1 loss against Switzerland in an away match on 30 May 1954. Unable to score in all three fixtures, Bleijenberg was not called back up to the national team again.

Personal life
He managed amateur sides SDVB, VVOP, Nunspeet, VEVO and his son Hans also played professional football for Vitesse Arnhem, FC Eindhoven en SC Cambuur.

Death
Bleijenberg died in January 2016, aged 85.

Honours

Club
Ajax
 Eredivisie: 1956–57, 1959–60

Statistics for Ajax 

1 Includes championship play-off.

Notes

References
Evert Vermeer, Marcelle van Hoof. Ajax 100 Jaar Jubileumboek 1900–2000. Amsterdam: Luitingh-Sijthoff, 1999.

External links
Wim Bleijenberg at ererat.nl

1930 births
2016 deaths
People from Veenendaal
Association football forwards
Dutch footballers
Netherlands international footballers
FC Wageningen players
AFC Ajax players
Blauw-Wit Amsterdam players
Go Ahead Eagles players
AGOVV Apeldoorn players
Eredivisie players
Footballers from Utrecht (province)